Peaked Hill, also known as Kai Yet Kok, is a stack island on the westernmost point on land of Hong Kong territories. The island is close to the west side of southwest Lantau Island, near Tsin Yue Wan and can be spotted from the 7th stage of Lantau Trail between Fan Lau and Yi O.

The island is north of Lantau Channel and affected by the current from the Pearl River. West of the island are the territories of mainland China.

See also

List of islands and peninsulas of Hong Kong
Outlying Islands

External links
Aerial image from Google Map
Picture of Peaked Hill

Uninhabited islands of Hong Kong
Islands District
Islands of Hong Kong